The 1995 Major League Baseball postseason was the playoff tournament of Major League Baseball for the 1995 season. This was the first postseason to be played under the expanded format, as the League Division Series (LDS) was played in both the American and National leagues for the first time since 1981. The league was expanded to three divisions per league, and a new Wild Card berth was added. The winners of the LDS moved on to the League Championship Series to determine the pennant winners that face each other in the World Series.

This was the first postseason to take place since the 1994–95 MLB strike. 

In the National League, the Atlanta Braves returned to the postseason for the fourth consecutive year, the Cincinnati Reds returned for the first time since 1990, the Los Angeles Dodgers made their first appearance since 1988, and the Colorado Rockies, just two years into their existence, made the postseason for the first time ever. 

In the American League, the New York Yankees returned to the postseason for the first time since 1981, and this was the first of thirteen consecutive appearances for the Yankees from 1995 to 2007. The Cleveland Indians made their first postseason appearance since the 1954 World Series, and this was the first of five consecutive postseason appearances for the Indians. The Boston Red Sox made their fourth appearance in the past ten years, and the Seattle Mariners made the postseason for the first time in franchise history.

The postseason began on October 3, 1995, and ended on October 28, 1995, with the Braves defeating the Indians in six games to win their first championship in Georgia, and their first overall since 1957. It was the Braves' third title in franchise history.

Playoff seeds
With each league being split into three divisions, the three division winners of each league automatically qualified for the postseason. The Wild Card was won by the team that posted the best record outside of the division winners. 

The following teams qualified for the postseason:

American League
 Boston Red Sox - 86–58, Clinched AL East
 Cleveland Indians - 100–44, Clinched AL Central
 Seattle Mariners - 79–66, Clinched AL West
 New York Yankees - 79–65, Clinched Wild Card

Home-field advantage priority order: West, East, Central

National League
 Atlanta Braves - 90–54, Clinched NL East
 Cincinnati Reds - 85–59, Clinched NL Central
 Los Angeles Dodgers - 78–66, Clinched NL West
 Colorado Rockies - 77–67, Clinched Wild Card

Home-field advantage priority order: Central, East, West

Playoff bracket

American League Division Series

Boston Red Sox vs. Cleveland Indians

This was the first postseason meeting between the Red Sox and Indians. The Indians swept the Red Sox to advance to their first ever ALCS. It was the first playoff series win by the Indians since the 1948 World Series. Aside from an extra-inning Game 1, the Indians would win Game 2 in a 4-0 shutout, and then blow out the Red Sox in Game 3 in Boston to advance to the next round.

Both teams would meet again in the ALDS in 1998, 1999 and 2016, as well as the 2007 ALCS, with the Red Sox winning in 1999 and 2007, and the Indians winning in 1998 and 2016.

Seattle Mariners vs. New York Yankees

This was the first postseason series ever played in the Pacific Northwest. It was also the first postseason meeting between the Mariners and Yankees. The Mariners overcame an 0-2 series deficit to defeat the Yankees in five games and advance to the ALCS for the first time in franchise history. 

In the first postseason series played in the Bronx in 14 years, the Yankees prevailed in an offensive duel in Game 1, 9-6, and then took Game 2 after fifteen innings of play to go up 2-0 in the series headed to Seattle. The Mariners won their first playoff game in franchise history with a 7-4 victory in Game 3. Game 4 was a slugfest which the Mariners won 11-8 to force a fifth game. In Game 5, the Mariners rallied in the bottom of the eighth inning to tie the game and send it into extra innings, which was then capped off by Edgar Martinez's series-winning double in the 11th inning of Game 5, known as "The Double" in Mariners' baseball lore. 

The Mariners and Yankees would meet again in the 2000 and 2001 ALCS, with the Yankees winning both series.

National League Division Series

Atlanta Braves vs. Colorado Rockies

This was the first postseason series ever played in the Mountain West region. The Braves defeated the Rockies in four games to advance to the NLCS for the fourth year in a row. 

In Denver, the Braves narrowly took Game 1, and then took Game 2 by three runs to go up 2-0 in the series headed to Atlanta. The Rockies won their first playoff game in franchise history with a 7-5 victory in Game 3 after 10 innings. However, the Braves closed out the series in Game 4 by blowing out the Rockies, 10-4, to advance to the NLCS.

This would be the last postseason appearance by the Rockies until 2007, where they went on a Cinderella run to the World Series.

Cincinnati Reds vs. Los Angeles Dodgers

The Reds swept the Dodgers to return to the NLCS for the second time in six years. This series was not close - the Reds blew out the Dodgers in Game 1 in Los Angeles, with the only close contest coming in Game 2, which the Reds won 5-4 to go up 2-0 in the series heading back to Cincinnati. In Game 3, the Reds again blew out the Dodgers to advance to the NLCS.

As of 2022, this is the last time the Reds won a playoff series. The Dodgers returned to the postseason the next year, but were swept by the Atlanta Braves in the NLDS.

American League Championship Series

Seattle Mariners vs. Cleveland Indians

This was the first postseason meeting between the Mariners and Indians. The Indians defeated the Mariners in six games to return to the World Series for the first time since 1954. Both teams split the first two games in Seattle, and when the series moved to Cleveland for Game 3, the Mariners prevailed to take a 2-1 series lead. However, their lead would not hold, as the Indians won the next three games to secure the pennant. 

The Indians and Mariners would meet again in the postseason in 2001, with the Mariners defeating the Indians in five games in the ALDS. The Indians would win the pennant again in 1997 over the Baltimore Orioles in six games.

The Mariners would return to the postseason in 1997, but they would lose to the Orioles in the ALDS. This was the first of three consecutive losses in the ALCS for the Mariners - they returned to the ALCS in 2000 and 2001, losing both to the New York Yankees.

National League Championship Series

Cincinnati Reds vs. Atlanta Braves

The Braves swept the Reds to return to the World Series for the third time in five years (in the process preventing an all-Ohio World Series from taking place). In Cincinnati, the Braves took Games 1 and 2 in extra innings, and when the series moved back to Atlanta, the Braves completed a sweep of the Reds with a 6-0 shutout in Game 4.

This would be the last postseason appearance by the Reds until 2010, where they were swept by the Philadelphia Phillies in the NLDS. This was the last postseason series ever played at Riverfront Stadium.

As of 2022, this is the last time that the Reds appeared in the NLCS. The Braves would return to the NLCS the next year, where they overcame a 3 games to 1 series deficit against the St. Louis Cardinals to return to the World Series.

1995 World Series

Cleveland Indians (AL) vs. Atlanta Braves (NL) 

This was a rematch of the 1948 World Series, which the Indians won in six games over the then-Boston Braves. After two previous failed attempts, the Braves finally prevailed, defeating the Indians in six games to win their first title since 1957.

The Braves narrowly took Games 1 and 2 by one run each to go up 2-0 in the series. When the series moved to Cleveland, the Indians narrowly prevailed in an 11-inning Game 3 to avoid a sweep. However, the Braves would prevail in Game 4, 5-2, to go up 3-1 in the series. The Indians narrowly won Game 5 by a 5-4 score to send the series back to Atlanta. In Game 6, the Braves prevailed in a 1-0 shutout, capped off by Atlanta's Marquis Grissom catching the final out in the top of the ninth inning. This was the first professional sports championship for the state of Georgia.

The Braves returned to the World Series the next year, but lost to the New York Yankees in six games. They would win their next title in 2021, against the Houston Astros, also in six games.

The Indians would return to the World Series in 1997, but they fell to the Florida Marlins in seven games. They would also reach the World Series in 2016, where they lost to the Chicago Cubs in seven games after leading the series 3 games to 1.

References

External links
 League Baseball Standings & Expanded Standings - 1995

 
Major League Baseball postseason